Charles Moody (1792–1867) was a British Conservative Party politician. 

Charles Moody may also refer to:

Charles E. Moody (1891–1977), songwriter
Charles Amadon Moody (1863–1910), American author and book reviewer
 Charles Harry Moody (1874–1965), English composer and organist